Alwin Boldt (19 March 1884 – 1920) was a German cyclist. He competed in three events at the 1908 Summer Olympics.

References

External links
 

1884 births
1920 deaths
German male cyclists
Olympic cyclists of Germany
Cyclists at the 1908 Summer Olympics
Place of birth missing
Cyclists from Berlin